Corben Creek is a stream in the municipality of Minden Hills, Haliburton County, and the unitary city of Kawartha Lakes in Central Ontario, Canada. It is in the Great Lakes Basin and is tributary of Balsam Lake.

Course
It exits Corben lake at its southern tip, continues south, passes under Kawartha Lakes Road 45, and reaches Four Mile Lake, leaving that lake at the south.

References

Rivers of Kawartha Lakes
Rivers of Haliburton County